Paulownia is a genus of seven to 17 species of hardwood tree (depending on taxonomic authority) in the family Paulowniaceae, the order Lamiales. They are present in much of China, south to northern Laos and Vietnam and are long cultivated elsewhere in eastern Asia, notably in Japan and Korea.

It was introduced to North America in 1844 from Europe and Asia where it was originally sought after as an exotic ornamental tree. Its fruits (botanically capsules) were also used as packaging material for goods shipped from East Asia to North America, leading to Paulownia groves where they were dumped near major ports. The tree has not persisted prominently in US gardens, in part due to its overwintering brown fruits that some consider ugly. In some areas it has escaped cultivation and is found in disturbed plots. Some US authorities consider the genus an invasive species, but in Europe, where it is also grown in gardens, it is not regarded as invasive.

The genus, originally Pavlovnia but now usually spelled Paulownia, was named in honour of Anna Paulowna, queen consort of The Netherlands (1795–1865), daughter of Tsar Paul I of Russia. It is also called "princess tree" for the same reason.

Paulownia trees produce as many as 20 million tiny seeds per year. However, the seeds are very susceptible to soil biota and only colonize well on sterile soils (such as after a high temperature wildfire). Well-drained soil is also essential. Successful plantations usually purchase plants that have been professionally propagated from root cuttings or seedlings. Although seeds, seedlings, and roots of even mature trees are susceptible to rot, the wood is not and is used for boat building and surfboards.

Trees can grow to maturity in under 10 years and produce strong, lightweight timber, good as firewood, with an even higher strength to weight ratio than balsa wood. Its density is low at around 0.28 kg/liter, although significantly higher than balsa's very low 0.16 kg/liter.

Morphology 

Paulownia is a genus of angiosperm trees, and one of the fastest growing trees in the world. The leaves grow in opposite decussate pairs, and as the name tomentosa suggests, are covered in hairs. The leaf margin can be toothed or entire and sometimes may be slightly lobed. They can be distinguished from common look alike genera such as Catalpa and Cercis by secondary and tertiary venation. The leaves are late to come in on the tree and late to fall from the typically deciduous Paulownia, however in tropical areas the tree can become evergreen. The leaves are often preceded by pale violet to purple shaded tubular flowers similar to a foxglove. Like most members of the Lamiales the flowers are zygomorphic. (C) The thick fused calyx is covered by a brown hairy indumentum and the fused calyx tube is the same length as its calyx lobes, except in P. catalpifolia and P. elogata where the lobes are shorter than the calyx tubes. The corolla has 5 fused lobes with a shorter adaxial bilobed lip and a somewhat longer abaxial trilobed lower lip. The lips of all the petals are curled and their surface tomentose.

On the inner side of the lower trilobed corolla tube run two light yellow folded ridges from the calyx to the lip. These are interpreted as floral guides to the top of the corolla tube. (C) Inside the corolla tube, and approximately half way down, are 4 stamen filaments fused to the petals at the base, with 2 being longer than the others. At the bottom of the corolla tube is a short corolla-stamen tube. The base of the stamen filaments are bent so that they run along the upper portion of the flower with the arrow shaped anthers then depositing pollen on the dorsal side of a variety of pollen-feeding insects. (D) The superior bilocular ovary, surrounded by the brown calyx, with its stigma and style rising up, is approximately the same length as the longer stamen filaments that surround it. This is left on the stem as the corolla and stamen fall off. The stigma tip has a singular small hole that leads to a tubular dilated chamber at the top of the style covered in receptive papillae. In the species P. kawakamii this stigma tip is slightly bilobed. This is a unique morphological characteristic to distinguish Paulownia from all of the Lamiales. At the bottom of the ovary is a nectary with nectary slits on the basal sides of the ovary beneath a hairy region. The ovary then develops into a sticky green oval capsule tapered at the apex with the remaining dried up style sometimes still attached. (F) The capsule remains on the persistent brown calyx were they can last on the tree through the rest of the year before turning brown and woody and loculicidal dehiscence reveals up to 2000 small winged seeds stacked tightly inside. (G) The tiny seeds have lateral wings  that gradually increase in length around the seed. The ventral and dorsal side of the seed are flat. This wing shape on the seeds is another distinguishing characteristic of Paulownia from the rest of the Lamiales.  (A) The new buds, enclosed by the early brown fuzzy calyx, are visible in late summer to early fall and wait dormant, alongside the brown seed capsules, till spring.

Fossil record
Paulownia once occurred in North America, with fossilized leaves found in Tertiary strata of Ellensburg Canyon of Washington state.

Paulownia macrofossils have been recovered from the late Zanclean stage of the Pliocene sites in Pocapaglia, Italy and Paulownia caucasica macrofossils have been recovered from strata of the Serravallian stage of the Miocene in Georgia in the Caucasus region. It is believed that the climate then would have been suitable for the genus across the whole northern hemisphere.

Uses 

In China, it is popular for roadside planting and as an ornamental tree. Paulownia needs much light and does not like high water tables.

As a forestry crop Paulownia are exacting in their requirements, performing well only in very well draining soil, with summer rainfall or availability of irrigation water. Paulownia grown on plantations generally has widely spaced growth rings, meaning that it is soft and of little value; wood with close growth rings is harder and of higher value. Paulownia is extremely fast growing; up to 20 feet in one year when young. Some species of plantation Paulownia can be harvested for saw timber in as little as five years. Once the trees are harvested, they regenerate from their existing root systems, earning them the name of the "Phoenix tree".

Paulownia is also used in Chinese agroforestry systems because it grows fast, its wood is light but strong, its flowers are rich in nectar, its leaves make good fodder for farm animals, it is deep-rooting, and it is late-leafing and its canopy is quite sparse so that crops below it get both light enough to grow and shelter.

Paulownia is the mon of the office of prime minister, and also serves as the Government Seal of Japan used by the Cabinet and the Government of Japan (whereas the chrysanthemum is the Imperial Seal of Japan). It is one of the suits in the card game hanafuda, associated with the month of November or December (some regions reverse the order of these two months).

Japan: An Illustrated Encyclopedia states:

Paulownia wood is very light, fine-grained, and warp-resistant.  It is the fastest-growing hardwood. It is used for chests, boxes, and clogs (geta). The wood is burned to make charcoal for sketching and powder for fireworks, the bark is made into a dye. The silvery-grey wood is sliced into veneers for special visiting cards.

It is important in China, Korea, and Japan for making the soundboards of stringed musical instruments such as the guqin, guzheng, pipa, koto, and gayageum. More recently it is used as body material for low-cost electric guitars, as the core for lightweight touring skis, and for surfboard cores. It is used in guitars as the core body, then laminated under a more durable wood.

Species 

Tested and confirmed species:
Potential variety, hybrid, and synonym species:

References

External links

 Paulownia forestry information 
 Paulownia Research Center in China (Shaanxi)
 Flora of China - Paulownia
 Paulownia trees.org
 silvatree.com: Paulownia forestry
 fadr.msu.ru: "Paulownia, the Tree of Choice in China"

Energy crops
Garden plants of Asia
Lamiales genera
Ornamental trees
Phytoremediation plants
Paulowniaceae
Trees of China
Trees of Laos
Trees of Vietnam